The Water Authority of Western Australia, also known as WAWA, was a statutory authority of the state government that was responsible for the water supply, sewerage, and main drainage within Western Australia between 1985 and 1996.

History 
The Water Authority of Western Australia was founded in 1985 under the Water Authority Act 1984. Its purpose was to manage the water supply, sewerage, and main drainage across the entire state of Western Australia. Previously, these had been managed by two separate entities: the Metropolitan Water Authority covered the metropolitan region, and the Public Works Department covered regional Western Australia.

It was replaced by the Water Corporation in 1996.

Education 
In 1995, the Water Authority created the Waterwise Schools Program, to educate school studentsand their parents and teachersabout the value of water resources, and the importance of protecting them. The first "Waterwise School" was Hillarys Primary School. The program has since expanded to include almost half of the schools in WA.

Notes

References

Further reading
 Water Authority of Western Australia.(1987) The 1986/87 re-organisation / the Water Authority of Western Australia. Leederville, W.A.: The Authority.  (appendices).  (summary)
 Western Australia. Steering Committee for the Merger of State Water Authorities. (1984) Report of the Steering Committee for the Merger of State Water Authorities. Perth, W.A. The Committee. 

Water companies of Australia
Water management authorities
Defunct government agencies of Western Australia
Public utilities established in 1985
1985 establishments in Australia
1996 disestablishments in Australia
Government agencies disestablished in 1996